Mohammad Shoriful Islam (Bengali: মোহাম্মদ শরিফুল ইসলাম; born 3 June 2001) is a Bangladeshi cricketer. He made his international debut for the Bangladesh cricket team in March 2021.

Domestic and under-19 career
Shoriful made his first-class debut for Rajshahi Division in the 2017–18 National Cricket League on 15 September 2017. He made his List A debut for Prime Bank Cricket Club in the 2017–18 Dhaka Premier Division Cricket League on 7 February 2018.

Shoriful was the joint-leading wicket-taker for Prime Bank Cricket Club in the 2017–18 Dhaka Premier Division Cricket League, with 17 dismissals in 8 matches.

Shoriful made his Twenty20 debut for Bangladesh A against Ireland A on 13 August 2018. The next day, he was one of twelve debutants to be selected for a 31-man preliminary squad for Bangladesh ahead of the 2018 Asia Cup.

In October 2018, Shoriful was named in the squad for the Khulna Titans team, following the draft for the 2018–19 Bangladesh Premier League. In December 2018, he was named in Bangladesh's team for the 2018 ACC Emerging Teams Asia Cup. In December 2019, he was named in Bangladesh's squad for the 2020 Under-19 Cricket World Cup.

International career
In January 2021, Shoriful was one of four uncapped players to be named in a preliminary squad for the One Day International (ODI) series against the West Indies. Later the same month, he was named in Bangladesh's ODI squad for their matches against the West Indies. The following month, he was named in Bangladesh's squad for their series against New Zealand. He made his T20I debut for Bangladesh on 28 March 2021, against New Zealand.

In April 2021, Shoriful was named in Bangladesh's preliminary Test squad for their series against Sri Lanka, before being named in the final 15-man squad for the first Test. He made his Test debut on 29 April 2021, for Bangladesh against Sri Lanka. In May 2021, he was named in Bangladesh's ODI squad for their series against Sri Lanka. He made his ODI debut for Bangladesh on 25 May 2021, against Sri Lanka.

In September 2021, he was named in Bangladesh's squad for the 2021 ICC Men's T20 World Cup.

References

External links
 

2001 births
Living people
Bangladeshi cricketers
Bangladesh Test cricketers
Bangladesh One Day International cricketers
Bangladesh Twenty20 International cricketers
Rajshahi Division cricketers
Khulna Tigers cricketers
Prime Bank Cricket Club cricketers
People from Panchagarh District